Wootha is a rural locality in the Sunshine Coast Region, Queensland, Australia. In the  Wootha had a population of 201 people.

History 
The name Wootha comes from the Kabi language (Dallambara dialect) meaning red cedar tree.

Blackall Range Provisional School opened about 1886, becoming Blackall Range State School on 1 October 1909. It was renamed Wootha State School in 1937. It closed in 1949.

In the  Wootha had a population of 201 people.

Attractions 

Despite its name, Maleny Botanic Gardens and Bird World is at 233 Maleny Stanley River Road in Wootha.

See also
Blackall Range road network

References

Further reading 

  — includes Blackall Range State School

Suburbs of the Sunshine Coast Region
Localities in Queensland